The Poynette School District is a public school district in Columbia County, Wisconsin, United States, based in Poynette, Wisconsin.

Schools
The Poynette School District has two elementary schools, one middle school and one high school.

Elementary schools 
Poynette Elementary School

Middle school
Poynette Middle School

High school
Poynette High School

References

External links

School districts in Wisconsin
Education in Columbia County, Wisconsin